Dulguun Odkhuu (born June 5, 1991 in Ulaanbaatar) is a Mongolian actress. Her career began when she was studying as an actress at the great university, and in 2011 Dulguun Odkhuu became a popular actress as she made her film debut playing in the Amidrald Tavtai Moril (2011), Mongolian National Broadcasting TV Series.

Early life 
Dulguun was born in Ulaanbaatar, Mongolia, on June 5, 1991, and spent most of her life there as one of three children. She completed the Fifth High School in the Chingeltei district of Ulaanbaatar in 2008. Becoming an actress was her childhood dream, and having the Mongolian University of the Arts and Culture, her dream university, adjacent to her high school, fueled her dreams even further.

Education 
Upon completing high school, she was able to fulfill her dream and studied at the Mongolian University of Arts and Culture from 2008 to 2012, focusing on film, acting, and drama. Earning her Bachelor's degree (BA). From 2017 to 2019, she earned a Master of Arts (MA) degree, majoring in Acting and Screenwriter, from the Academy of Art University in San Francisco, California.

Career

2011- The beginning of the career 
Dulguun began her professional career with outstanding performance while studying acting at university. She made her film debut playing leading and supporting roles in Mongolian television series, such as Hairiin Ereld (2011) and Amidrald Tavtai Moril (2011). She had also been working as an actress at the Dream Theatre in Mongolia since 2011.

2012-2016

Theatre 
After graduating from university in 2012, she continued to be a company actress at the Dream Theatre. Having gained more than two years of experience there and continuing to be cast in further performances, her stage roles led director N. Naranbaatar to handpick her to become an actress at the Mongolian Academic Drama Theatre. With that, she began to forge the unique path of her dramatic arts career.

Throughout her successful career at the theatre, Dulguun rose to fame with her portrayal of Juliet in Romeo and Juliet, play by William Shakespeare, in 2015 at 24. Making her the youngest actress to portray Juliet in Mongolia's theatre history, and following she was the lead role of Hamlet, Ophelia.

Film 
In addition to being a talented actress in the dramatic arts, Dulguun has worked on several films. Highlights of her performances include:

In 2011, she starred as Maral in Neg Hoyoriin Guravaa (2011), a Mongolian Feature Film by the Wizard Production. This was her first triumphant leading role in a feature film.  

2013- 2015, she portrayed Gereltsetseg in Single Ladies-1 and Single Ladies-2, a sequel Mongolian Feature Film by U Film Production. This sequel reached a large audience in Mongolia and influenced the further rise of her career.  

2015, she played the role of Siilegmaa in a Mongolian feature film, Mash Nuuts (2015), which has various battle and historical scenes by the Fantastic Production. Mash Nuuts was the top-grossing film for the first week of its release date, September 18, 2015.

She also played the lead role of Solongo in the Mongolian comedy film Gatsuurkhan (2016). Produced in 2016 for a New Year's program by Mongol TV.

2017-2019 
2017, Dulguun began pursuing a Master of Arts (MA) degree in acting and screenwriter at the Academy of Art University in San Francisco, California. While studying in the states, she starred in two major feature films during her summer holidays in Mongolia. She returned to the screens as Gereltsetseg in the "Single Ladies-3" (sequel film 2017). As well as portray the lead role of Od in Tengerees Buusan Od (2019), a Mongolian feature film by Khuvisal Production.

Filmography

Film

Television

Theatre

Awards

Other awards 

 In 2013 – Best Employee Award – Dream Theatre
 In 2015 – Award for "Best Debut" for the role of Juliet in a play, Romeo and Juliet – National Academic Drama Theatre
 In 2016 – The Young Leader Gold Medal – the Mongolian Youth Federation 
 In 2016 – Award "Credential Letter" for the Labor and social protection – Ministry of Labor and social protection Ministry of Education
 In 2019 – Cultural merit laureate of Mongolia – Ministry of Education and Culture of Mongolia

References

External links 

21st-century Mongolian actors
Academy of Art University
Mongolian film actors
Mongolian actresses
Mongolian film actresses
People from Ulaanbaatar
Living people
1991 births